Kadapa Feeder Expressway is a proposed greenfield expressway road in the Indian state of Andhra Pradesh. It is being built by the National Highways Authority of India under Phase–VII of National Highways Development Project.

The project 
The cost of project is expected to be . It would cut travel time between Amaravathi and Kadapa by 70 minutes. The expressway will be 4-lane wide with service roads. It was proposed that this road will be designed for a speed of 120 kmph with straight alignments, avoiding habitations and locations of archaeological and religious importance. Tunnels and viaducts are proposed to be constructed to avoid hilly terrains and valley sections. The Express-way will carry all public amenities viz. under passes, service roads, provision for green belt, rest houses, petrol pumps, service centres, restaurants and four agricultural mandis for milk, potatoes, grains, fruits and vegetables etc.

Route 
It will be connected to Amaravati Anantapur Expressway from Kadapa.It will have a total length of 4 Major bridges, 1 Railway Over Bridges, 4 Interchanges, and 2 km Length of Tunnel.

References

Roads in Amaravati
Roads in Kadapa district
Expressways in Andhra Pradesh
Proposed roads in India